The Men's Boxing Tournament at the 1967 Pan American Games was held in Winnipeg, Manitoba, Canada, from July 24 to August 6.

Medal winners

Medal table

External links
Amateur Boxing

1967
1967 Pan American Games
Pan American Games